Mats Wilander was the defending champion.

Wilander successfully defended his title, defeating Henrik Sundström 3–6, 6–1, 6–3 in the final.

Seeds

  Mats Wilander (champion)
  Guillermo Vilas (semifinals)
  Henrik Sundström (final)
  Tomáš Šmíd (first round)
  Heinz Günthardt (quarterfinals)
  Anders Järryd (semifinals)
  Balázs Taróczy (second round)
  Jimmy Brown (second round)

Draw

Finals

Top half

Bottom half

External links
 ATP main draw

1983 in Swiss sport
1983 Grand Prix (tennis)
1983 Geneva Open